The Chuvash National Museum in Cheboksary, Russia, is a cultural, educational and research center of the Chuvash Republic. Founded in 1921, it is the largest repository of natural, historical, cultural and theological artefacts of the Chuvash people and other ethnic groups.

Branches 
The museum has four branches:
 Chapaev Museum (Cheboksary)
 Ivanov Literature Museum
 Sespel Museum (Cheboksary)
 Sespel Museum (Sespel)

The museum also houses the Society for the Study of the Native Land, an association of ethnographers that introduces the life and culture of the Chuvash people to the population of the Republic.

There are 160,000 pieces in the museum.

See also 
 Chuvash National Movement
 Society for the Study of the Native Land
 Chuvash National Congress

References

External links 
 Site of the Chuvash National Museum
 Page Museum at the site "Museums of Russia"
 About the museum at the official government portal of the Chuvash Republic

Museums in Chuvashia
Local museums in Russia